The women's 800 metres event at the 2002 Commonwealth Games was held on 27–29 July.

Medalists

Results

Heats
Qualification: First 2 of each heat (Q) and the next 6 fastest (q) qualified for the semifinals.

Semifinals
Qualification: First 3 of each heat (Q) and the next 2 fastest (q) qualified for the final.

Final

References
Official results
Results at BBC

800
2002
2002 in women's athletics